Ferenc Seres (born 1945) is a Hungarian wrestler. He was born in Tiszakécske. He won an Olympic bronze medal in Greco-Roman wrestling in 1980. He won a bronze medal at the 1973 World Wrestling Championships.

References

1945 births
Living people
Olympic wrestlers of Hungary
Wrestlers at the 1972 Summer Olympics
Wrestlers at the 1976 Summer Olympics
Wrestlers at the 1980 Summer Olympics
Hungarian male sport wrestlers
Olympic bronze medalists for Hungary
Olympic medalists in wrestling
Medalists at the 1980 Summer Olympics
20th-century Hungarian people